This is a list of museums in Iraq.

Museums in Iraq 
 Amna Suraka Prison 
 Baghdadi Museum
 Basrah Museum
 Ennigaldi-Nanna's museum
 Illusion Museum Erbil
 Erbil Civilization Museum
 Kurdish Textile Museum
 Kurd's Heritage Museum
 Memory Islam Museum
 Mosul Museum
 Museum of Samarra
 Nasiriyah Museum
 National Museum of Iraq
 Sherwana Castle
 Syriac Heritage Museum
 Sulaymaniyah Museum
 Tikrit Museum

See also 

 List of museums

Museums
 
Iraq
Museums
Museums
Iraq